Louis d'Armagnac, Duke of Nemours (1472; Normandy, France – 28 April 1503; Cerignola, Italy), was a French nobleman, politician and military commander who served as Viceroy of Naples during the Third Italian War (1502-1504). He was known for most of his life as the Count of Guise, and inherited the Duchy of Nemours following his brother Jean's death in 1500.

Family  
Louis was the third son of Jacques d'Armagnac, Duke of Nemours and Louise of Anjou. In 1491, he was made Count of Guise, a title last held by his uncle Charles IV, Duke of Anjou. Upon the death of his elder brother Jean in 1500, he became Duke of Nemours.

Viceroy of Naples 
Louis was made  viceroy of Naples in 1501, during the Third Italian War (1502-1504). He was killed at the battle of Cerignola on 28 April 1503.

Notes

Sources

1472 births
1503 deaths
15th-century Neapolitan people
Armagnac, Louis d'
Armagnac, Louis d'
Military leaders of the Italian Wars
French military personnel killed in action